Mahlon Black (October 4, 1820 – October 25, 1901) was an American politician and soldier.

Black was born in Hamilton County, Ohio. Black served in the House of Representatives of the 1st Minnesota Territorial Legislature in 1849, the 3rd Minnesota Territorial Legislature in 1852, and the 8th Minnesota Territorial Legislature in 1857. Following his time in the statehouse, he was postmaster in Stillwater, Minnesota from 1857 to 1861, and mayor between 1860 and 1861.

During the Civil War, he served in the 2nd Company of Minnesota Sharpshooters.

Notes

1820 births
1901 deaths
People from Hamilton County, Ohio
People from Stillwater, Minnesota
People of Minnesota in the American Civil War
Minnesota Territory officials
Members of the Minnesota Territorial Legislature
19th-century American politicians
Mayors of places in Minnesota
Minnesota postmasters